Lee Hill  is a South African Exercise Scientist and former head coach of the University of Cape Town swimming team as well as a published scientific author. He specialises in the injuries to the shoulder, with a specific interest in swimming injuries.

Academic career 
He obtained an undergraduate degree in Human Bioscience, specialising in Psychology and Human Physiology. In 2012, Hill earned a post-graduate degree was in Exercise Science, obtained from the Division of Exercise Science and Sports Medicine at the University of Cape Town. He is currently reading towards a doctorate in Exercise Science at the University of Cape Town. 

Hill has been published in a number of peer-reviewed journals such as the Oxford Research Encyclopedia of Psychology, the South African Journal of Sports Medicine and the Physician and Sports Medicine.

References

1989 births
Living people
University of Cape Town alumni
Sports scientists